Ansienulina mirabilis is a species of jumping spiders. It is the only species in the genus Ansienulina.

Distribution
A. mirabilis has been discovered in Angola, Kenya and Namibia. It probably lives on the ground in tree-covered areas.

History
A. mirabilis was first described by Wanda Wesołowska in 2015. The species is the same or similar to an example of Eustiromastix major identified by Eugène Simon in 1903.

Description
The male spider is dark yellow to light brown, while the female has an orange-brown carapace and greyish beige abdomen, with Kenyan examples being generally darker.

References

Salticidae
Fauna of Angola
Fauna of Kenya
Fauna of Namibia
Spiders of Africa
Spiders described in 2015
Taxa named by Wanda Wesołowska